Boanarí (Bonari) is an extinct and poorly attested Cariban language. Kaufman (2007) placed it in his Atruahí branch.

References

Cariban languages
Extinct languages